Igor Kichigin (born 23 November 1969 in Bukhara) is an Uzbekistani football coach and a former player.

Honours
Nuravshon Bukhara
Uzbek League runner-up: 1994

Neftchi
Uzbek League champion: 1995
Uzbek Cup winner: 1996

References

External links
 

1969 births
People from Bukhara
Living people
Soviet footballers
Buxoro FK players
Uzbekistani footballers
Uzbekistan international footballers
FC Fakel Voronezh players
Uzbekistani expatriate footballers
Expatriate footballers in Russia
Russian Premier League players
FC Temp Shepetivka players
Expatriate footballers in Ukraine
FK Neftchi Farg'ona players
FK Dinamo Samarqand players
FC Izhevsk players
Uzbekistani football managers
FC Daugava managers
Uzbekistani expatriate football managers
Expatriate football managers in Latvia
Uzbekistani expatriate sportspeople in Russia
Uzbekistani expatriate sportspeople in Ukraine
Uzbekistani expatriate sportspeople in Latvia
Association football defenders